Epinotia bilunana is a moth of the family Tortricidae. It is found in Europe, and quite widespread throughout Britain.

The wingspan is 13–17 mm. The moth flies from May to August. .

It is easy to identify with its creamy or whitish gray wings, and blackish marking on either side of the median area, starting half way between the costa and dorsum and finishing at the dorsum.

The larvae feed internally on the catkins of birch.

Notes
The flight season refers to Belgium and the Netherlands. This may vary in other parts of the range.

External links

 waarneming.nl 
 Lepidoptera of Belgium
 Epinotia bilunana at UKmoths

Olethreutinae
Tortricidae of Europe
Taxa named by Adrian Hardy Haworth